The Nigerian Air Force (NAF) is the air branch of the Nigerian Armed Forces. It is the youngest branch of the Nigerian Armed Forces.
It is one of the largest in Africa, consisting of about 18,000 personnel as at 2021and aircraft including 9 Chengdu F-7s, 12 Dassault-Dornier Alpha Jets, three JF-17 Thunder Block II and 12 Embraer EMB 314 Super Tucano aircraft, 24 M-346 FAs on order, Helicopter gunships, armed attack drones, and military transport aircraft.

History

Although an Air Force was originally proposed in 1958, many lawmakers preferred to rely on the United Kingdom for air defense. But during peacekeeping operations in Congo and Tanganyika, the Nigerian Army had no air transport of its own, and so in 1962, the government began to recruit cadets for pilot training in various foreign countries, with the first ten being taught by the Egyptian Air Force.

1960s
The Nigerian Air Force was formally established on 18 April 1964 with the passage of the Air Force Act 1964 by the National Assembly. The Act stated that the "Nigerian Air Force shall be charged with the defense of the Federal Republic by air, and to give effect thereto, the personnel shall be trained in such duties as in the air as well as on the ground." The NAF was formed with technical assistance from then West Germany (now Federal Republic of Germany following the re-unification of West and East Germany). The air force started life as a transport unit with the first aircrews trained in Canada, Ethiopia and India. The head of the German Air Force Assistance Group (GAFAG) was Colonel Gerhard Kahtz, and he became the first commander of the NAF. The nucleus of the NAF was thus established with the formation of the Nigerian Air Force headquarters at the Ministry of Defense.

The NAF did not acquire combat capability until several Mikoyan-Gurevich MiG-17 aircraft were presented by the Soviet Union in support of Nigeria’s war effort during the unfortunate Nigerian Civil War. On 13 August 1967, following several damaging attacks by Biafran aircraft, the USSR started delivering first MiG-17s from Egypt to Kano IAP, simultaneously sending a large shipment aboard a Polish merchant ship. Initially two MiG-15UTI (NAF601 and NAF 602), and eight MiG-17 (NAF603 to NAF610) was supplied to Nigeria. Later six Il-28 bombers, initially flown upon deployment by Egyptian and Czech pilots, were delivered from Egypt and stationed at Calabar and Port Harcourt.

1970s
In July 1971, the International Institute for Strategic Studies estimated that NAF had 7,000 personnel and 32 combat aircraft: six Ilyushin Il-28 medium bombers, eight MiG-17, eight Aero L-29 Delfín jet trainers, and 10 P-149D trainers. Other aircraft included six C-47, 20 Do-27/28, and eight Westland Whirlwind and Alouette II helicopters.

During the 1970s, Nigeria bought Lockheed C-130 Hercules from the United States. Six were acquired at a total cost of $45 million. 25 Mikoyan-Gurevich MiG-21MFs and six MiG-21UM were delivered in 1975 upon the advent of the Murtala-Obasanjo administration that replaced the regime of General Yakubu Gowon. Most of these aircraft were deployed, making the NAF one of the most formidable air forces in Africa during this period.

Jimi Peters wrote: '..the 1975-1980 NAF development plan restructured NAF formations' into group (air force) level units that reported to air force headquarters. That structure, he went on, was found too cumbersome, and thus two intermediate commands (military formations) were formed in 1978: NAF Tactical Air Command and NAF Training Command.

1980s
From 1984, 18 SEPECAT Jaguar fighters (13 Jaguar SNs & 5 Jaguar BNs) were delivered and operated from Makurdi. They retired in 1991. Nigeria purchased 24 Aero L-39 Albatros armed jet trainers in 1986-87, having retired its fleet of L-29 that were donated to the Republic of Ghana Air Force at the inception of the West African Monitoring Group (ECOMOG) operations in Liberia. A subsequent attempt to expand the fleet by acquiring 27 more in 1991 was not executed.

2000s
In 2005, under the administration of President Olusegun Obasanjo, the Nigerian Parliament appropriated US$251 million to purchase 15 Chengdu F-7 fighter aircraft from China. The deal included 12 F-7NI (NI-Nigeria) single seat fighter variant, and 3 FT-7NI dual-seat trainer aircraft. The $251 million package included $220 million for 15 aircraft, plus $32 million for armaments: live PL-9C AAM, training PL-9 rounds, unguided rockets, and 250/500  kg bombs. The pioneer NAF pilots on the aircraft trained in China in 2008, while delivery of the aircraft began in 2009. (Nigeria had previously considered a $160 million deal to refurbish its fleet of MiG-21's by Aerostar/Elbit Systems, IAI, and RSK MiG). However, it was considered more cost effective to opt for acquiring the F-7s which were brand new. Nigeria also caused a modification of its variant of the F7, including installing some western equipment and avionics and hence its official designation as “F7-Ni” to reflect that its variant differs in some respect from a typical Chinese F-7. With this acquisition, her fleet of MiG 21's were subsequently grounded. The Federal Government of Nigeria under the same dispensation acquired some ATR Maritime Patrol aircraft for NAF, built by EADS and Finmeccania / Alenia Aeronautica, boosting the capacity of the service to carry out extensive Intelligence, Surveillance and Reconnaissance (ISR) missions on land and far into the sea.
 
From September 2009, Nigeria began refurbishing some of its C-130 aircraft beginning with the NAF 917 which it brought back to life with the support of U.S. Air Forces Africa and 118th Airlift Wing. The NAF has subsequently further improved its domestic capacity with the increase in the serviceability of a good number of its transport aircraft.

2010s
The NAF designed and built its first indigenous UAV, the "Gulma," which was unveiled by former president Goodluck Jonathan in Kaduna, who said that the "Gulma" would be useful in aerial imaging/mapping, telecommunications, and weather monitoring. According to him, the UAV was rapidly becoming an important tool in news coverage, environmental monitoring, and oil and gas exploration. 

On 24 March 2011, the new Air Officer Commanding of NAF Mobility Command, Air Vice Marshal John Aprekuma, explained the rationale behind the establishment of the headquarters of the newly established Air Force Mobility Command in Yenagoa, Bayelsa State as being part of the Federal Government's strategy to protect its socio-economic interest in the Niger Delta, affirming that the presence of the command's headquarters would bring about security and calm to the people of the State.

On 9 December 2011, the Nigerian Air Force commissioned its first female pilot, Blessing Liman, following a directive to the NAF hierarchy by former President Goodluck Jonathan, for the service to start offering flying opportunities to qualified Nigerian female citizens, especially since women had long been flying civil aviation aircraft in the country but did not get a chance to fly in the military.

In March 2014, the Nigerian Government approached Pakistan for the purchase of joint Chinese-Pakistani made CAC/PAC JF-17 "Thunder" multi-role fighter aircraft. In December 2015, the Government of President Muhammadu Buhari presented a budget to the National Assembly that included N5bn for three JF-17 aircraft. On March 28, 2018, 'The Diplomat' reported Pakistan as confirming the sale of three JF-17 to Nigeria. In March 2020, NAF Chief of Air Staff announced the delivery schedule of three JF-17 Thunder to be affected in November 2020. It is understood that the Buhari administration will expand the fleet of JF-17 fighter aircraft upon an expression of satisfaction by NAF Generals, with the performance of the initial batch procured.

In December 2017, NAF formally announced that the United States of America had agreed to sell the A-29 Super Tucano attack aircraft to Nigeria after the deal had previously stalled. The success of this transaction is credited to the persistent negotiation and diplomatic skills of the Buhari administration.

In November 2018, Sierra Nevada was officially awarded the contract for the 12 Super Tucano aircraft for the NAF with an estimated completion date by 2024.

On 2 January 2019, one Mi-35M attack helicopter from the Nigerian Air Force helicopter squadron crashed in Damasak, Borno State while providing close-air support for troops of the 145 Battalion combating Boko Haram insurgents, killing all onboard. The Mi-35 in the fleet of NAF is top of the range models acquired in the life of the administration of President Muhammadu Buhari that had also ordered several Mi-171 and Agusta 109 helicopters from both Mil Moscow Helicopters of Russia and Italy's Leonardo Aerospace for the service.

On 15 October 2019, the NAF winged its first female combat fighter jet pilot Flight Lieutenant Kafayat Sanni and first female combat helicopter pilot Lieutenant Tolulope Arotile. They were amongst thirteen other pilots also winged on the same day.

In April 2020, Embraer reported the completion of the first set of Super Tucano jets out of the 12 on order with an expected full delivery in 2021.

Structure 
The Air Force includes a service headquarters, 6 principal staff branches, 4 direct reporting units, and 4 operational commands.

The Chief of the Air Staff (CAS) is the principal or lead adviser to the President and also the Minister of Defense and the Chief of Defense Staff, on air-related defense matters. The Nigerian Air Force headquarters is responsible for establishing long and short-term mission objectives and articulating policies, carrying out plans and procedures for the attainment of peace and stability. Also, HQ NAF liaises with the Nigerian Army and Nigerian Navy on joint operational policies and plans. The headquarters NAF consists of the office of the Chief of the Air Staff and 8 staff or branches namely; Policy and Plans Branch, Operations Branch, Air Engineering Branch, Logistics Branch, Administration Branch, Accounts and Budget Branch, Inspections Branch and Air Secretary Branch respectively. Each of these branches is headed by an Air Vice Marshal as branch chief.

NAF Tactical Air Command (TAC), with its headquarters situated at Makurdi, is responsible for interpreting, implementing and controlling NAF operational plans.

33 Logistics Group (33 LOG GP), Makurdi
35 Base Service Group (35 BSG), Makurdi
45 NAF Hospital, Makurdi
47 NAF Hospital, Yola
64 Air Defense Group (ADG) NAF, Makurdi
65 Forward Operations (65 FOB) Badagry
75 Strike Group (75 STG), Yola
79 Composite Group (73 CG), Maiduguri
81 Air Maritime Group (81 AMG), Benin
97 Special Operations Group (97 SOG), Port Harcourt
99 Air Combat Training Group (99 ACTG), Kainji

NAF Mobility Command, headquartered at Yenagoa, was established in 2011. It has five other commands located in Lagos, Ilorin, Calabar, Warri and Abuja. The Mobility Command performs tactical and strategic airlift in support of government and military operations.

Detachments, Wings, and Forward Operational Bases include:

203 Medium Airlift Group (203 MAG), Ilorin
205 Rotary Wing (205 RW), Lagos
207 Special Mobility Group (207 SMG), Calabar
209 Executive Airlift Group (209 EAG), Minna
235 Base Service Group (235 BSG), Yenagoa
237 Base Service Group (237 BSG), Minna
301 Heavy Airlift Group (301 HAG), Lagos
61 NAF Detachment, Warri
Ibadan Forward Operating Base (FOB)
Sokoto Forward Operating Base (FOB)
NAF Training Command, located at Old Kaduna Airport, is chiefly responsible for the training of recruits, ground support crew, and technicians.

301 Flying Training School, Kaduna
303 Flying Training School, Kano
305 Helicopter Group, Enugu.
325 Ground Training Centre, Kaduna
330 NAF Station, Jos
333 Logistics Group (333 BSG), Kaduna
335 Base Services Group (335 BSG), Kaduna
337 Base Service Group (337 BSG), Enugu
339 Base Service Group (339 BSG), Kano
347 NAF Hospital, Jos
349 NAF Hospital Kano
345 Aeromedical Hospital, Kaduna
Aeromedical Centre Project, Kaduna

NAF Logistics Command, headquartered at Ikeja, Lagos, is tasked to procure, maintain and sustain equipment in a state of operational readiness and at a minimum cost consistent with NAF mission requirements.

401 Aircraft Maintenance Depot (401 ACMD), Ikeja, within Murtala Mohammed International Airport
403 Electronic Maintenance Depot (403 EMD), Shasha
405 Central Armament Depot (405 CAD), Makurdi
407 Equipment Supply Depot (407 ESD), NAF Ikeja
435 Base Service Group (435 BSG), Ikeja
445 NAF Hospital, Ikeja

NAF Special Operations Command (SOC), headquartered at Bauchi, Bauchi State.

201 Composite Group, Bauchi, Bauchi State
205 Combat Search and Rescue Group, Kerang, Plateau State
207 Quick Response Group, Gusau, Zamfara State
209 Quick Response Group, Ipetu-Ijesha, Osun State
211 Quick Response Group, Owerri, Imo State
21 Quick Response Wing, Agatu, Benue State
22 Quick Response Wing, Doma, Nasarawa State
23 Quick Response Wing, Gembu, Taraba State

Bases
 NAF Abuja - (based within the Nnamdi Azikiwe International Airport, Abuja)
 NAF Kaduna is the Old Kaduna Airport - Kaduna State
 NAF Port Harcourt - Rivers State
 NAF Benin - Edo State
 NAF Maiduguri - Borno State
 NAF Minna (based within Minna Airport) - Niger State
 NAF Makurdi (based within Makurdi Airport) - Benue State
 NAF Kano (based within Mallam Aminu Kano International Airport) - Kano State
 NAF Enugu (based within Akanu Ibiam International Airport) - Enugu State
 NAF Jos - Plateau State
 NAF Ipetu-Ijesha – Osun State
 NAF Shasha - Lagos State
 NAF Kainji - Niger State
NAF Katsina - Katsina State
NAF Yola - Adamawa State
NAF Mando - Kaduna State
NAF Unguwan - Kaduna State

Aircraft

Current inventory

Incidents and accidents 
On 26 September 1992, a NAF Lockheed C-130H Hercules serial number 911 crashed three minutes after take-off from Lagos, Nigeria, when three engines failed, possibly due to high take-off weight. All 158 people on board were killed, including eight foreign nationals. 

On 25 January 2015, a photo appeared online at Beegeagle's Blog, appearing to show a CASC Rainbow CH-3 UCAV which crashed upside down near Dumge village in the Mafa District of Borno State.  The two anti-tank missiles on the CH-3's wings appear to be intact. Borno is the area where much of the Boko Haram violence, including the massacre of 2,000 civilians, occurred in 2015.  Currently, the Nigerian military is fighting to hold onto the city of Maiduguri against a Boko Haram 
onslaught, so it appears likely that the CH-3 in question was flying reconnaissance and fire support missions for the military when it crashed. The use of armed drones by Nigerian forces in combat makes Nigeria one of the first five countries to do that in combat history.

On 28 September 2018, a fatal air collision involving two F-7 aircraft occurred during a formation flying exercise involving an Aeritalia G.222 and three Alpha Jets as they practiced flight maneuvers for the 58th Independence Day celebrations in the capital, Abuja. As the F-7 jets turned to the formation flying, their wings clipped each other's side. Both planes lost stability due to the collision and it resulted to the spiral loss of both jets and they both crashed at the Katampe district of Abuja. Three pilots ejected out of the crippled jets. The two pilots who were on the F-7Ni ejected and landed with minor G-force injuries, and the third pilot on the F-7 ejected and sustained head injuries due to the problems from the parachute as it deployed. The pilot later died thereafter, on the way to the hospital as emergency services rushed to the scene of the crash. The Nigerian Air Force was notified and responded with search and rescue for all three pilots, while witnesses helped in evacuating the pilots from their stricken planes. 

On 31 March 2021, an Alpha Jet crashed near Borno State in North Eastern Nigeria, after it was conducting an air interdiction on Boko Haram. At about 5:08 p.m., the jet was reported to have stopped pinging on radar and presumed to have crashed. The wreckage was reported missing and found nineteen months later by Nigerian Army troops. 

On 18 July 2021, while returning from an air interdiction mission in North Western region of Nigeria along the Kaduna-Zamfara state boundaries, an Alpha Jet piloted by Flight Lieutenant Abayomi Dairo was shot down by "armed bandits" in Zamfara State. Flight Lieutenant Dairo successfully ejected from the plane, evaded capture and made his way to a Nigerian Armed Forces base in the area sustaining minor injuries. He was given a "hero's return" by the Chief of Defense Staff and other top officers, Armed Forces of Nigeria, General Lucky Irabor, alongside other military top brass.

Rank structure

Commissioned officer ranks
The rank insignia of commissioned officers.

Other ranks
The rank insignia of non-commissioned officers and enlisted personnel.

References

Bibliography 
 Michael I. Draper and Frederick Forsyth, Shadows: Airlift and Airwar in Biafra and Nigeria 1967-1970 (Howell Press, 2000) 
 Hoyle, Craig. "World Air Forces Directory". Flight International, Volume 192, No. 5615, 5–11 December 2017. pp. 26–57. 
 Martin, Guy. "Nigerian Regeneration". Air International. Vol 83 No 5, November 2012. pp. 84–89. ISSN 0306-5634.
 Sampson, A. (1977) The Arms Bazaar: From Lebanon to Lockheed, Viking, 
''World Aircraft Information Files. Brightstar Publishing, London. File 338 Sheet 01

External links

 
 Nigerian Air Force reactivates 10 aircraft 

 
1964 establishments in Nigeria
Defence agencies of Nigeria
Military units and formations established in 1964